Secret Service 2: Security Breach is a computer game created by 4D Rulers and published by Activision Value. It puts the player in the position of a member of the secret service whose purpose is to defend the President. It is a sequel to Secret Service (2001).

Story
The security of the President and the nation rests squarely on the player's shoulders. As a new recruit on the rise, they will be faced with many life-threatening situations. Relying on their instincts and training, they must detect threats and stop terrorist actions before they can become a reality. It's their responsibility to deal with the "bad guys", protect the good guys and the overall well-being of their country.

Features
 Escorting of officials through hostile environments
 Large arsenal, including dozens of tactical weapons from handguns to rocket launchers
 Graphics system with real-time lighting, particle effects, bump mapping, spectacular lighting, stencil shadowing and highly detailed environments
 Environments feature destructible objects, exploding barrels and other objects
 Locational damage system
 Encounter many types of criminals from low-level mob enforcers to highly dangerous terrorists

External links
 4D Rulers Official Homepage
 IGN review

2003 video games
Video games about police officers
Video games developed in the United States
Video games set in the United States
Windows games
Windows-only games
First-person shooters